The J. Sanford Saltus Medal Award is an annual award made to artists "for lifetime achievement in medallic art". It is administered by the American Numismatic Society. The award was first awarded in 1913 on the initiative of J. Sanford Saltus to reward sculptors "for distinguished achievement in the field of the art of the medal". The medal was designed in silver by Adolph A. Weinman, himself the second winner of the award. While this medal was at first only given to Americans, since 1983 foreign artists are also eligible to receive this award.

Recipients 

1919 – James Earle Fraser
1920 – Adolph A. Weinman
1921 – John Flanagan
1922 – Victor D. Brenner
1923 – Hermon Atkins MacNeil
1925 – Paul Manship
1926 – Laura Gardin Fraser
1927 – Anthony de Francisci
1931 – Edward W. Sawyer
1937 – Lee Lawrie
1946 – Chester Beach
1948 – Henry Kreis
1949 – Carl Paul Jennewein
1950 – Gertrude K. Lathrop
1951 – Albert Laessle
1952 – Bruce Moore
1953 – Walker Hancock
1954 – Sidney Waugh
1955 – Theodore Spicer-Simson
1956 – Thomas G. Lo Medico
1959 – Abram Belskie
1960 – Bruno Mankowski
1964 – Robert Weinman
1966 – Albino Manca
1967 – Donald De Lue
1968 – Michael Lantz
1969 – Stanley F. Martineau
1970 – Joseph Kiselewski
1975 – Granville Carter
1979 – Karen Worth
1980 – Agop Agopoff
1983 – Guido Veroi
1984 – Marcel Jovine
1985 – Edward R. Grove
1986 – Kauko Räsänen
1987 – John Cook
1988 – Jiří Harcuba
1990 – Keiichi Uryu
1991 – Eugene L. Daub
1992 – Mico Kaufman
1993 – Ewa Olszewska-Borys
1994 – Marianne Letterie
1995 – Alex Shagin
1996 – Nicola Moss
1997 – Leonda Finke
1998 – Helder Batista
1999 – Jeanne Stevens-Sollman
2000 – Bernd Göbel
2001 – Gustaaf T.M. Hellegers
2002 – Toivo Jaatinen
2003 – Dora de Pédery-Hunt
2005 – Theo van de Vathorst
2009 – Ron Dutton
2011 – João Duarte
2014 – Pawel Leski
2017 - Bogomil Nikolov (Bulgaria)
2018 - Geer Steyn (Holland)
2019 – Mashiko
2020 – Anna Franziska Schwarzbach (Germany)

References 

Awards for numismatics
Currency lists
Lists of award winners
American sculpture awards
Awards established in 1913
1913 establishments in the United States
Works by Adolph Weinman